Zhengzhou Greenland Central Plaza is an office complex in the Zhengdong New Area of Zhengzhou, Henan. The complex consists of two skyscrapers: the south tower and the north tower.

See also
Zhengzhou Greenland Plaza
Dalian Greenland Center
Wuhan Greenland Center
Goldin Finance 117
China Zun
Tianjin Chow Tai Fook Binhai Center

References

Skyscrapers in Zhengzhou
Commercial buildings completed in 2012
Skyscraper office buildings in China